Irshad Pass (elevation ), also called Ershād Yūvīn, Yirshod Wuyin, Irshad Urween, Irshād Uwin, Kotale Ers̄āḏ Owīn, or Kowtal-e Ershād Owīn, is a high mountain pass that connects the Chapursan river valley in Gilgit-Baltistan province with the Wakhan Corridor in Afghanistan.

According to a map shown in the National Geographic Magazine, the elevation of Irshad Pass is slightly higher than the figure given above, at 4,979 m. (16,335 ft.) The article mentions that the nomadic Kyrgyz people of the Wakhan Corridor, who total only about 1,100, cross the Irshad Pass in spring and autumn to trade animals for supplies at Babaghundi Ziarat in north-western Hunza, Pakistan.

Footnotes

Mountain passes of Afghanistan
Mountain passes of Gilgit-Baltistan
Afghanistan–Pakistan border
Wakhan
Landforms of Badakhshan Province

Karakoram